The Secretary-General is the European Court of Auditors most senior member of staff.
Appointed for a renewable term of 6 years,
he is responsible for the management of the Court's staff
and for the administration of the Court.
In addition, the Secretary-General is responsible for the budget, translation, training and information technology.

List of Secretaries-General of the European Court of Auditors
 Patrick Everard - 16.10.1989 to 9.2.1994 
 Edouard Ruppert - 25.2.1994 to 30.6.2001
 Michel Hervé - 1.7.2001 to 31.10.2008 - France
 John Speed (ad interim) - 9.10.2008 to 15.3.2009 - UK
 Eduardo Ruiz Garcia - 16.3.2009 to present; nominated until 15.3.2015 - Spain

References

 Press release http://eca.europa.eu/products/ECA0916
 United Kingdom Parliament https://publications.parliament.uk/pa/ld200506/ldselect/ldeucom/270/27005.htm
 BBC http://news.bbc.co.uk/1/hi/world/europe/3595155.stm#s16

Civil Service of the European Union
Titles